Bahareh Rahnama  (born December 1, 1973) is an Iranian actress and author. She won a Hafez Award for her acting in Tambourine (2008).

Early life
She was born on December 1, 1973, in Arak, Iran. Her father, Jalal Rahnama is a businessman and her mother, Parvin Ghaem Maghami is an actress. They moved to Tehran in early 1980.

Career

Acting
Rahnama earned bachelor's degrees in Legal Rights and Persian Literature and a master's degree in Dramatic Literature. She also took screenwriting and acting courses, and worked as a journalist.

Her debut movie was Viber in 1991. Besides being a theatre, television and film actress, Rahnama is also a writer. She has collaborated in writing for The Nights of Barareh (2005), Mozaffar’s Garden (2006) and Shams-ol-Emareh (2009) series. Rahnama also published a book entitled Seven Nights in a Month, which is a collection of her notes from her personal blog over 7 years.

The Iranian actress has played roles in various movies, such as Tambourine (2007), St. Petersburg (2009), No Men Allowed (2010), Men Are from Mars, Women Are from Venus (2010), Laughter in the Rain (2011) and Sensitive Level (2013). She has also appeared in series, including The Story of a City (2000), I'm a Tenant (2003), The Man of a Thousand Faces (2007) and Goodbye Child (2012).

Political career
She supported Mir-Hossein Mousavi in 2009 Presidential election. She meet with Zahra Rahnavard, Mousavi's spouse in May 2009 and was one of the members of Mir-Hossein Mousavi presidential campaign. She is one of the writers of Chelcheragh, a weekly social magazine printed in Iran.

Personal life
She married Peyman Ghasemkhani in 1992. The couple divorced in 2016. Peyman is an Iranian screenwriter who mostly worked with Mehran Modiri. They have a daughter named Paria who was born in 1997. Paria has acted with her mother in two films, including Bano and Mard-e Hezar-Chehreh. Her mother, Parvin is also acted in TV series since 2004. Her former brother-in-law, Mehrab Ghasemkhani is also a writer and his former spouse, Shaghayegh Dehghan is an actress. Rahnama married Amir Khosro Abbasi in August 2017. In July 2022, Rahnama announced their separation on social media.

Filmography

References

External links

1973 births
Living people
People from Arak, Iran
People from Tehran
Iranian screenwriters
Iranian film actresses
Iranian stage actresses
Iranian television actresses
20th-century Iranian actresses
Islamic Azad University, Central Tehran Branch alumni